BASIS Educational Group. LLC, styled BASIS.ed, is a for-profit education management organization based in Scottsdale, Arizona. It serves primarily Basis Charter Schools, a non-profit charter management organization with offices in the same complex.

The BASIS Charter School network is organized by the regions in which the schools operate: BASIS Charter Schools, Inc, BTX Schools, Inc (Texas), BASIS D.C. (Washington D.C.), and BASIS Baton Rouge (Louisiana). In 2021, BASIS Charter Schools' 31 campuses enrolled 29,000 students. In 2018, BASIS Charter Schools claimed 29 schools and 17,000 students, which matches publicly available enrollment numbers from BASIS Charter Schools. In 2015, BASIS Charter Schools enrolled 12,014 students.

BASIS Independent School locations 
BASIS Independent Schools are private, tuition-based schools owned by Spring Education Group and using the BASIS Curriculum.

New York 
BASIS Independent Brooklyn, Pre-K-Grade 12
BASIS Independent Manhattan, Pre-K-Grade 12

California 
BASIS Independent Silicon Valley, Grades 5-12 (San Jose, California)
BASIS Independent Fremont, TK-Grade 12

Virginia 
BASIS Independent McLean, Age 2-Grade 12

BASIS International School locations

China 
BASIS International School Shenzhen (Shenzhen, China)
BASIS International School Guangzhou (Guangzhou, China）
BASIS International School Park Lane Harbour（Huizhou, China）
BASIS International School Hangzhou (Hangzhou, China)
BASIS International School Nanjing (Nanjing, China)
BASIS Bilingual School Shenzhen (Shenzhen, China)

Thailand
BASIS International School Bangkok (opening scheduled September 2019)

Controversy
Critics observe that the relationship between BASIS Educational Group and BASIS Charter Schools is not arms-length. As a result, there is little financial transparency. An investigative article in 2010, when there were three schools in the network, rather than the 29 schools operating in the 2020-21 academic year, compared the founders' salary to the teachers and other public school administrators.

The schools have suffered high attrition rates (senior classes are typically a third to a quarter of the size of the fifth-grade class). Critics argue that BASIS achieves great test scores in part by weeding out underperforming students, which is illegal. BASIS has denied this and notes that it cannot legally "weed out" students at a public school—and there is no proof of such action.

In 2013, the District of Columbia Public Charter School Board rejected a request to expand, citing concerns about the high number of students who had withdrawn from the school since it opened.

References 

Education management organizations